Giorgio Bocchino (14 July 1913 – 4 December 1995) was an Italian fencer. He won a gold and bronze medal at the 1936 Summer Olympics.

References

1913 births
1995 deaths
Italian male fencers
Olympic fencers of Italy
Fencers at the 1936 Summer Olympics
Olympic gold medalists for Italy
Olympic bronze medalists for Italy
Sportspeople from Florence
Olympic medalists in fencing
Medalists at the 1936 Summer Olympics